Brezzo may refer to:

 Brezzo di Bedero, municipality in the Province of Varese in the Italian
 Luis Brezzo, Uruguayan politician belonging to the Colorado party
 Thomas Brezzo, Monegasque lawyer and politician